The Riga LVRTC Transmitter was a mediumwave transmitter in Ulbroka near Riga, Latvia, which broadcast on 945 kHz a music program in DRM-simulcast mode, which was receivable at night time in wide parts of Europe.  It used as an antenna two guyed mast radiators. One of them was a  guyed lattice mast. The other smaller tower stays a Blaw-Knox Radiator. It is one of the few existing Blaw-Knox Radiators in Europe. Other towers of this type exist at Lisnagarvey, Northern Ireland, Lakihegy, Hungary, Vakarel, Bulgaria and Stara Zagora, Bulgaria.

Several masts were razed on 16 May 2010.

References

External links

 http://www.lvrtc.lv/tehres/popup.php?id=3

Towers in Latvia
Radio masts and towers in Europe
Buildings and structures in Riga